is a district located in Fukuoka Prefecture, Japan.

As of April 1, 2010, the district has an estimated population of 20,230 and a density of 534 persons per km2. The total area is 37.91 km2.

Towns and villages 
Hirokawa

Mergers
On October 1, 2006, the town of Jōyō merged into the city of Yame.
On February 1, 2010, the towns of Kurogi and Tachibana, and the villages of Yabe and Hoshino merged into the city of Yame.

External links
 Brief introduction of Yame tea in English

Districts in Fukuoka Prefecture